Frederick E. James (1845 – 17 July 1907) was an American artist. He was noted for his depictions of 18th-century American life.

James was born in Philadelphia, Pennsylvania. He trained first at the Pennsylvania Academy of the Fine Arts and later under the famed French artist Jean-Léon Gérôme. He died in Percé, Quebec, Canada.

Portraits by him of Benjamin Franklin, Stephen Girard, and the Marquis de Lafayette hang in the Masonic Temple in Philadelphia.

Works

"A Colonial Wedding", 1883.

"Canadian Kitchen"
"Mischianza", 1881.
"The Introduction"

19th-century American painters
19th-century American male artists
American male painters
20th-century American painters
Artists from Philadelphia
1845 births
1907 deaths
20th-century American male artists